Puhi (literally, "blow" in Hawaiian) is a census-designated place (CDP) in Kauai County, Hawaii, United States. The population was 3,380 at the 2020 census, up from 1,186 at the 2000 census.

Geography
Puhi is located on the southeastern side of the island of Kauai at  (21.968479, -159.398248).

, or 0.50%, of the current area is water.

Demographics

As of the census of 2000, there were 1,186 people, 285 households, and 255 families residing in the CDP. The racial makeup of the CDP was 8.3% White, 0.2% African American, 0.7% Native American, 65.7% Asian, 2.5% Pacific Islander, 0.3% from other races, and 22.4% from two or more races. Hispanic or Latino of any race were 7.8% of the population.

There were 285 households, out of which 37.9% had children under the age of 18 living with them, 71.2% were married couples living together, 10.2% had a female householder with no husband present, and 10.5% were non-families. 6.3% of all households were made up of individuals, and 2.8% had someone living alone who was 65 years of age or older.  The average household size was 4.16 and the average family size was 4.13.

In the CDP the population was spread out, with 26.7% under the age of 18, 10.1% from 18 to 24, 27.3% from 25 to 44, 20.7% from 45 to 64, and 15.1% who were 65 years of age or older.  The median age was 36 years. For every 100 females, there were 97.3 males.  For every 100 females age 18 and over, there were 103.0 males.

The median income for a household in the CDP was $51,563, and the median income for a family was $50,000. Males had a median income of $27,625 versus $22,933 for females. The per capita income for the CDP was $16,175.  About 4.5% of families and 7.2% of the population were below the poverty line, including 14.3% of those under age 18 and 1.9% of those age 65 or over.

See also
Huleia National Wildlife Refuge
Kipu Falls

References

Census-designated places in Kauai County, Hawaii
Populated places on Kauai